Certified and recognized cycling records are those verified by the Union Cycliste Internationale, International Human Powered Vehicle Association and World Human Powered Vehicle Association, Guinness World Records, International Olympic Committee, World UltraCycling Association (formerly Ultra Marathon Cycling Association), the UK Road Records Association or other accepted authorities.

Speed record on a bicycle 
The table below shows the records people have attained while riding bicycles.

History of unpaced records 
The International Human Powered Vehicle Association (IHPVA) acts as the sanctioning body for new records in human-powered land, water, and air vehicles. It registers non-motor-paced records (also called unpaced), which means that the bicycle directly faces the wind without any motor-pacing vehicle in front.

The female record holder for this same category was Lisa Vetterlein, who reached  in 2005. This record was beaten by Barbara Buatois of France, when she reached  at Battle Mountain in 2009. She subsequently achieved  at the 2010 running of the Battle Mountain event.

History of motor-paced records 

Motor pacing is a type of cycling record where a pace vehicle is modified by adding a tail fairing to keep the wind off the cyclist who is riding behind it. This type of record was invented by Charles "Mile-a-Minute Murphy" who drafted a train to set a  record in 1899. A mile of plywood sheets was attached to the railroad ties, so Charles would have a smooth surface riding behind the train.

In 1928, Leon Vanderstuyft from Belgium reached 122 km/h riding behind a motorbike at a velodrome. Alexis Blanc-Garin from France set the record to 128.20 km/h in October 1933 riding behind a motorbike. Albert Marquet, from France, reached 139.90 km/h riding behind a car in 1937. On 22 October 1938, Alfred Letourneur reached 147 km/h at a velodrome in Montlhéry, France, riding behind a motorbike.  On 17 May 1941 Letourneur broke the record again, reaching  on a Schwinn bicycle riding behind a specially equipped midget racer, on a Los Angeles freeway near Bakersfield, California.

The first to surpass 200 km/h was the Frenchman Jose Meiffret in 1962, when he reached  behind a Mercedes-Benz 300SL car on a German motorway.

Allan Abbott, a cycling enthusiast and motorcycle racer, elevated the motor-paced bicycle speed record at the Bonneville Salt Flats, reaching  in 1973.

He used a special bicycle behind a dragster of the Strasburg Drag Racing Team at the Bonneville Salt Flats.

Mueller was coached by former record holder John Howard. On 17 September 2018, again at Bonneville, she took the outright world record, riding a special KHS bike with a 62Tx12T gear (488 gear-inches) to a new overall record top speed of 183. behind a converted rail dragster with a fairing.

History of downhill records 
During the last decade of the 20th century, two Frenchmen, Eric Barone and Christian Taillefer, set the speed record descending on snow several times. On 28 March 2015, Eric Barone reached  at Vars ski resort, France, besting his own record from 2000, using a specially designed prototype bicycle.

Using a serial production bicycle, as opposed to prototype bicycles, the record holder is Markus Stöckl from Austria.

The top descending speeds have always been obtained on snow. Apart from that, the ashes of a volcano have been the other surface used. Markus Stöckl did beat the serial production bicycle record in 2011 when he reached  on a volcano in Nicaragua and again in 2017 when he reached  down a volcano in Chile. The prototype bicycle record, on a volcano, still belongs to Barone.

Hour records 

The hour record for bicycles is the record for the longest distance cycled in one hour on a bicycle. The most famous type of record is for upright bicycles meeting the requirements of the Union Cycliste Internationale (UCI). Hour-record attempts are made in a velodrome, frequently at high elevation for the aerodynamic benefit of thinner air. Between 1997 and 2014 the UCI retrospectively restricted hour record competitors to roughly the same equipment as was used by Eddy Merckx in his 1972 record. In 2014, the UCI changed the hour record rules to permit using any upright bike allowed for endurance track events. However, other retrospective changes to hour record regulations are why the current hour records are not the farthest absolute distance.

The UCI hour records  are:
 UCI men's record: Filippo Ganna , 2022,   
 UCI women's record: Ellen van Dijk , 2022,   
 UCI farthest distance men's: Chris Boardman , 1996,  

Another type of record registered by the International Human Powered Vehicle Association (IHPVA) and the World Human Powered Vehicle Association (WHPVA) is for human-powered machines, typically fully streamlined recumbent bicycles. These feature a lower frontal area than a UCI bicycle due to their recumbent seating design of the rider. They enclose the rider and machine in aerodynamic shapes made of carbon fiber, Kevlar, or fiberglass to reduce air resistance. A further type of record is for partially streamlined recumbents, which are open but have either a windshield in front or a streamlined tail-box in the rear. This is registered by the World Recumbent Racing Association (WRRA).

 Streamlined recumbent bicycle (bicycle and rider enclosed in an aerodynamic shell): Francesco Russo of Switzerland set a new World Record by covering  in one hour at the DEKRA test track in Germany on 2 August 2011.  This record is approved by the WHPVA. On 19 July 2009, Sam Whittingham at the Ford Motor Company's 5-mile oval test track in Romeo, Michigan, achieved 90.598 km. This record was approved by the IHPVA and WHPVA committees. In 2008, Damjan Zabovnik achieved 87.123 km 
 Non-streamlined Recumbent Bicycle (no shell, only disk wheels, and rider sitting on top frame). The best mark was achieved by Aurelien Bonneteau, a French rider at the Bordeaux velodrome. He rode a bicycle with a nearly horizontal seat to allow his back to lie flat, two standard sized wheels, an elliptical chainring, and shortened pedal arms to reduce the air volume swept out by his legs.

24 Hours record

Men's Road record 
 Charles Terront is claimed to have covered  in 1879.
 George Pilkington Mills set the record at  circa 1890.
 Cyril Heppleston set the road record at  circa 1938.

Women's Road record 
 Beatrice Grimshaw claimed to have broken the women's road record c. 1900 however the distance ridden is unclear, no authority has recognised the record and there are doubts about her claim.

Men's track record 

Women's track record 
In July 2018 Nici Walde claims to have ridden  at the Opel Test Center in Rodgau-Dudenhofen, Germany. however  the ride is yet to be recognised by the World Human Powered Vehicle Association.

Long-distance records

Pembroke to Great Yarmouth
Pembroke to Great Yarmouth is the traversal of the whole width of the island of Wales and England between two extremities; Starting in Pembroke in the West and finishing in Great Yarmouth in the East. The record is also known as the Side to Side record. Some of its current records are:
 Upright bicycle: In October 2018 Nick Clarke claimed the record in 15h 23m 59s,
 Women's record: Maria Bloom, 2004, 16h 51m 56s 
 Men's Tandem bicycle Record: Tim Bayley & Adam Broyad, 2019, 14h 15m 20s.

Land's End to John O'Groats
Land's End to John O'Groats is the traversal of the whole length of the island of Great Britain between two extremities; in the southwest and northeast. Some of its current records are:
 Upright bicycle: In June 2018 Michael Broadwith claimed the record in 43h 25m 13s.
 Faired recumbent bicycle: Andy Wilkinson, 1996, 41h 4m 22s.
 Women's record: Christina Mackenzie, 2021, 51h 5m 5s.
 Women's tricycle record: Jane Moore, 2014, 88h 45m 21s.
 Men's Tandem Record: D Irvine & C Mitchell, 2015, 45h 11m 0s.
 Mixed Tandem Record: A Wilkinson & L E A Taylor (Lynne Biddulph), 2000, 51h 19m 23s.

Return journey between Land's End and John O'Groats
Ben Rockett claimed to have set a record of 141h 8m 0s  for an upright bicycle from Land's End to John O'Groats to Land's End, being the return journey of Land's End to John O'Groats. Its status as a record however was dubious as no recognised authority certified the record.

In September 2017 James MacDonald set a Guinness world record, starting and finishing at John O'Groats. Guinness certified the record as covering  in 5 days 18 hours and 3 minutes, beating Rockett's time by 3 hours and 5 minutes.

On 3 September 2020, Marcia Roberts became the first female to record the journey starting at Lands End, by bike, in a time of 11 days, 13 hours & 13 minutes and set a Guinness World Record.

One Thousand miles
On 13 March 1940 Pat Hawkins set the 'World 1,000 mile record' in Perth, having ridden the  distance in 4 days, 8 hours and 7 minutes, cutting 9 hours 53 minutes off Vera Unthank's record.

Men's record: Gethin Butler, 2001. After setting the Lands End to John O'Groats record in 2001 Gethin Butler continued to ride, completing 1000 miles in 55 hours 59 minutes 0 seconds.
Women's record: Lynne Taylor, 2001. After setting the women's Lands End to John O'Groats record, Lynne Taylor continued to ride, completing 1000 miles in 64 hours and 38 minutes.

Ultra Marathon
Race Across America, an ultra marathon bicycle race across the United States that started in 1982. The fastest average speed records are:

 Solo man: Christoph Strasser, 2014, who averaged  riding  in 7 days, 15 hours, and 56 minutes.
 Solo woman: Seana Hogan, 1995, who averaged  riding  in 9 days, 4 hours, 2 minutes.

Seven days
On Sunday 17 March 1940 Pat Hawkins, an 18-year-old female from Western Australia, set the 'World Seven Days record' in Perth, having ridden  to surpass the previous best set by Mrs Valda Unthank of Hastings, Victoria. Hawkins also broke the West Australian records for one, two, three, four, five, six and seven days, plus surpassing the Australian professional men's record of Ossie Nicholson. No authority appears to maintain this record, however notable distances ridden in seven days include:
 Tommy Godwin rode  between 16 and 22 July 1939.
 Bruce Berkeley rode  between 23 and 29 June 2014.
 Richard Nutt rode  between 1 and 7 June 2015.
 James Golding rode  between 19 and 25 June 2017.
 Bruce Berkeley rode  between 6 and 12 January 2020.

One month
There are 2 authorities currently recognising this record, Guinness World Records and World Ultra Cycling Association (formerly the UltraMarathon Cycling Association). Tommy Godwin rode  in July 1939, on his way to setting the World Endurance record for a single year however no authority has recognised this as a record. Current record holders are:

 WUCA record holder Amanda Coker rode  in April 2017.
Guinness World Record holder Janet Davison rode  between 24 July and 22 August 2015.
 WUCA male record holder Steven Abraham rode  between 2 September and 1 October 2016.
 Guinness World Record holder Mark Beaumont (UK) rode  between 2 and 31 July 2017, travelling from Paris to Jerramungup, Western Australia.\

100,000 Miles

On 11 July 2017, 24-year-old Amanda Coker set a new "Fastest completion of 100,000 miles by bicycle record, doing so in 423 days. Coker's record improved by 77 days on Tommy Godwin's prior record of 500 days set in May 1940. The record was certified by the Guinness Book of Records and the Ultra Marathon Cycling Association (now the WUCA).

World Endurance record for distance in a calendar year

Men's record
In 1911 the weekly magazine Cycling began a competition for the highest number of 100-mile rides or "centuries" in a single year. The winner was Marcel Planes with 332 centuries in which he covered . The inspiration for the competition was said to be the efforts of Harry Long, a commercial traveller who rode a bicycle on his rounds covering every part of England and Scotland and who covered  in 1910. The world record for distance cycled in a year began in an era when bicycle companies competed to show their machines were the most reliable. The record has been officially established nine times. A tenth claim, by the English rider Ken Webb in 1972, was disallowed. Apart from the 1911 competition organised by Cycling, there was no authority that set rules for record attempts nor certified the mileage ridden. In 1937 the League of Victorian Wheelmen declined a request by Ossie Nicholson for patronage for his attempt on the record. Nicholson's response was to appoint a committee to supervise his attempt. The mileage had been traditionally verified by way of a sealed milometer and cards signed by upstanding members of society such as police officers or postmasters.

In November 2014 the UltraMarathon Cycling Association announced that it would recognise a new record category for the highest annual mileage in a year, and set rules for the record. All of the previous record holders from Marcel Planes to Tommy Godwin rode a double-triangle diamond frame bicycle, and their rides all commenced on 1 January. The UltraMarathon Cycling Association decided, however, to permit any bike type except for faired recumbents, and that an attempt may start on any day of the year running for 365 consecutive days. Odometers and cards were replaced by GPS recording and live tracking devices such as the SPOT Satellite Messenger.

In 2015, three cyclists commenced an attempt to beat the record set by Tommy Godwin. Briton Steve Abraham started his attempt on 1 January, American Kurt Searvogel, nicknamed Tarzan, started 10 January, and Australian Miles Smith started on 18 June. Abraham was hit by a moped rider on 29 March 2015, breaking his leg above the ankle. After two weeks' recovery, Abraham resumed cycling gradually, using just one leg to pedal a recumbent trike. Having lost so much distance, he launched a concurrent attempt on the record starting on 8 August 2015, however he announced on 22 January 2016 that he had ended his concurrent attempt. Abraham rode  in his calendar year attempt. Smith ceased his attempt on 13 November 2015. Searvogel managed to overcome weather, injury and also married his one-woman support crew Alicia Searvogel, breaking Godwin's mark with five days to spare. Cycling Weekly reported a surprising number of people were less than charitable about Searvogel's amazing feat. Searvogel planned his attempt to hit his final mileage of 76,076 miles exactly, writing "The number is significant in that it took 76 years and 76,076 miles to take the record from the British – The spirit of 76 lives on". This UMCA record is also recognized as a Guinness World Record.

Women's record
During 1938 Billie Dovey, the English 'keep fit girl' of the 1930s, achieved a record . Contemporary advertising shows that she rode a Rudge-Whitworth bicycle and relied on Cadbury milk chocolate for energy. Dovey combined the attempt with a lecture tour, often finishing her ride and then giving a fitness lecture in the evening.

In February 1942 Pat Hawkins, the holder of the 'World Seven Days record', claimed to have ridden   in Perth, West Australia, despite having missed seven weeks riding. A few days later the claim was withdrawn due to discrepancies in her logs. The press had reported her campaign in relation to Billie Dovey's record, to wit, after ten weeks she had recorded  compared to Mrs Dovey's . She would have reached Dovey's record after 36 weeks, three days, one hour and 20 minutes. The endeavour was sponsored by Bruce Small Pty Ltd.

In 2016, Kajsa Tylen broke the record, exceeding Dovey's mileage on 24 November, with over a month of the year left to go. Guinness did not ratify Billie Dovey's record, and had set a target of over 50,000 km. Tylen cycled all over the UK and Europe, encouraging others to join her every day, and make 'sweat pledges' of support.

On June 4, 2016, Alicia Searvogel became the first woman over 50 years of age to make an attempt the Highest Annual Mileage record. While she fell short of breaking Amanda Coker's overall woman's record, Ms. Searvogel was awarded the highest annual mileage record, and highest month mileage record  in the 50–59 age category by the UMCA (now WUCA).

Road bicycle racing records 

The following is a list of Road bicycle racing achievements and records:

 Monument wins: Eddy Merckx (19), Roger De Vlaeminck (11), Costante Girardengo, Fausto Coppi, Sean Kelly (9)
 Grand Tour wins: Eddy Merckx (11), Bernard Hinault (10), Jacques Anquetil (8)
 Tour de France wins: Miguel Induráin (5 consecutive), Eddy Merckx (5), Bernard Hinault (5), Jacques Anquetil (5)
 Giro d'Italia wins: Alfredo Binda (5; 3 consecutive), Fausto Coppi (5) Eddy Merckx (5; 3 consecutives)
 Vuelta a España wins: Roberto Heras (4; 3 consecutive)
 Tour de France yellow jerseys: Eddy Merckx (96), Bernard Hinault (75), Miguel Induráin (60), Chris Froome (59), Jacques Anquetil (50), Antonin Magne (38), Nicolas Frantz and Philippe Thys (37)
 Giro d'Italia pink jersey : Eddy Merckx (78), Alfredo Binda (60), Francesco Moser (57), Gino Bartali (50), Giuseppe Saronni (49), Jacques Anquetil (42), Fausto Coppi and Bernard Hinault (31)
 Vuelta a España red jersey : Alex Zülle (48), Roberto Heras (34), Delio Rodríguez and Gustaaf Deloor (32)
 Triple Crown of Cycling: Eddy Merckx (1974), Stephen Roche (1987)
 UCI Road World Cup: Paolo Bettini (3)
 UCI Road World Rankings: Sean Kelly (5)
 Vélo d'Or award: Alberto Contador (4)

Track cycling records

Wheelie records

Kurt Osburn (nicknamed Wheelie King) from California, United States is the Guinness World Record holder for Longest Bicycle Wheelie, riding on the back wheel of a bicycle. On 8 August 1998, he rode a wheelie for a record 11 hours at the Anaheim Convention Center, California. In June 2012 David "Pixie" Robilliard failed to break the record.

From 13 April to 25 June 1999, he rode 2,839.6 miles from Hollywood to the Guinness World Records Experience in Orlando on one wheel, also for a Guinness World Record, becoming the first person in history to ride a bicycle wheelie coast to coast. During his attempt he rode an average of 50 miles per day, sometimes with winds in excess of 40 miles per hour. Other facts: He cycled on the 110 Highway, had 4 flat tires (on the rear tire of course), over 1.8 million pedal revolutions from start to finish, and was chased by dogs almost daily.

Around the world 

To qualify for the relevant Guinness World Record one must satisfy various requirements, such as total distance travelled, pass through two approximate antipodal points, provide specified evidence, etc.

 Jenny Graham cycled unsupported around the world in 124 days.
 Mark Beaumont cycled supported around the world in 78 days, 14 hours, 40 minutes.
 Lloyd Collier and Louis Snellgrove tandem cycled unsupported around the world in 281 days.
 Ed Pratt unicycled unsupported around the world in 3 years, 135 days.

Notes

References

External links 
 IHPVA
 WHPVA
 UCI records
 British Road Records Association
 British Cycling Time Trials
 Fastest Human Powered Vehicles One Hour & Top Speed Lists
 Cycling Records Registered by World Records of India

Cycle racing